The Queensland Rail Citytrain network, provides urban, suburban and interurban electric passenger railway services in South East Queensland, Australia.

History

The first railway in Queensland did not run to Brisbane, but ran from Ipswich to Grandchester and opened in July 1865. The line into Brisbane was not completed until the opening of the Albert Bridge in July 1875.

A start on electrification of the suburban network was approved in 1950 but a change of state government in 1957 saw the scheme abandoned in 1959. It was not until the 1970s that electrification was again brought up, with contracts let in 1975. The first part of the new electric system from Darra to Ferny Grove opened on 17 November 1979.<ref>"Brisbane Rail Electrification Stages 1 and 2 Armstrong, J Australian Railway Historical Society Bulletin August 1982 pp165-192</ref> The network was completed by 1988, with a number of extensions made since and additional rolling stock purchased. Services were initially operated under the Queensland Rail brand, with the Citytrain name established in 1995.

In June 2009 as part the split of Queensland Rail's commuter rail and the freight business, The Citytrain brand was dropped in favour of using the redesigned Queensland Rail brand. Since then most traces of the Citytrain'' brand have been removed from rolling stock and station signage.

On 8 March 2017, the Queensland Government released a report called "Fixing the trains: a high-level implementation plan to transform rail in Queensland" This report officially resurrected the Citytrain network naming for the first time since the split. Since this report, the Citytrain brand has slowly made its way back into reports. This brand re-emergence does not seem to be a controlled and deliberate action, but rather appeared in the report due to the Citytrain brand being well known amongst many within the Brisbane area. The report unofficially initiated a return of the Citytrain branding, and established the Citytrain Response Unit to respond to the plan.

The Queensland Rail website refers to the network as two different names. As 'The South East Queensland (SEQ) network', and the 'Citytrain network', however Queensland Rail has used the wording 'Citytrain network' back in 2017.

Network

The Queensland Rail Citytrain network is made up of ten suburban lines and three interurban lines. Centering in the Brisbane City CBD, it extends as far as Gympie in the north, Varsity Lakes in the south, Rosewood in the west, and Cleveland in the east to Moreton Bay.

In 2018/19, 55 million passenger journeys were made.

Urban
Urban services include those that connect Metropolitan Brisbane to the Brisbane CBD. The Caboolture line runs express between Bowen Hills and Petrie, stopping only at Eagle Junction and Northgate.  The Redcliffe Peninsula line runs express between Bowen Hills and Northgate, stopping only at Eagle Junction.  All other suburban lines are all-stop services with the Cleveland & Ipswich/Rosewood lines having express services during on-peak times.

Interurban
Express services which stop only at major stations linking the Gold Coast, Sunshine Coast and Gympie with Brisbane. The trains used on these lines typically are more designed for long-distance travel with more comfortable seating, luggage racks and onboard toilet facilities.

RailBus

To relieve congestion on the single track North Coast line north of Beerburrum, the rail service is supplemented by a bus service operated by Kangaroo Bus Lines on weekdays between Caboolture and Nambour as route 649.

Frequency 
As of March 2023, the daily off-peak service pattern is as follows:

Fleet
All of the Queensland Rail City Network rolling stock is electric and air conditioned.

 Electric Multiple Unit (EMU) - 28 in service (88 built)
 Suburban Multiple Unit (SMU)
200 Series (SMU200) - 12 in service (12 built)
220 Series (SMU220) - 30 in service (30 built)
 260 Series (SMU260) - 36 in service (36 built)
 Interurban Multiple Unit (IMU)
 100 Series (IMU100) - 10 in service (10 built)
 120 Series (IMU120) - 4 in service (4 built)
 160 Series (IMU160) - 28 in service (28 built)
New Generation Rollingstock
700 Series - 75 in service
Rollingstock Expansion Project (Planned)
20-65 new EMUs of undecided design

All trains are electric multiple units with a driver cabin at both ends, with the exception of EMU60 through EMU79 having a cab at one end. These units also had only 3 powered bogies (per 3 car set) compared to the 4 powered bogie arrangement for the remaining EMUs. The last of these units, EMU78, was scrapped in August 2020. All EMU, SMU and IMU units consist of 3 cars, giving a fleet total of 621 cars, plus the 20 ICE cars. The ICE units are usually configured as five car trains.

Suburban trains are occasionally scheduled on interurban lines if other toilet equipped rollingstock is not available. While using suburban trains on interurban lines increases operational flexibility, the trains are not provided with the facilities of the IMU, ICE or NGR units, such as toilets or high-backed seats.

The 260 Series SMU, 160 Series IMU and the NGR all come with free Wi-Fi on board. The Wi-Fi usage is limited to 20MB.

75 new six-car New Generation Rollingstock trains were ordered in January 2014 and were delivered between late 2015 and late 2019. A new maintenance facility for these trains was built at Wulkuraka. The first NGR entered service on 11 December 2017.

To keep up with projected passenger increases, the procurement of 20 new EMUs was announced in 2020, with TMR considering the option of ordering an additional 45 EMUs, potentially adding up to 65 new electric multiple units in the next decade.

See also
Commuter rail in Australia
TransLink, the public transport agency in South East Queensland

References

External links

TransLink

 
Regional rail in Australia
Passenger railway companies of Australia
Public transport in Brisbane
Public transport in Queensland
Rail transport in Queensland
Railway companies established in 1995
Translink (Queensland)
Australian companies established in 1995